Josef Čapek (1 August 1902 – 5 May 1983) was a Czech footballer who played for SK Slavia Prague, SK Kladno and the Czechoslovak national team.

Career
Born in Prague in 1902, he begin playing with Viktoria Žižkov in 1914 but in 1915 he joined the youth team of Slavia Prague. In 1920 Čapek had a short spell in the Kingdom of Yugoslavia playing with FK Vojvodina, a club with traditional connection with Slavia Prague. He returned to Slavia and stayed until 1928, winning the first edition of the Czechoslovak First League with them in 1925.

In 1927 he moved to another Czechoslovak First League club, SK Kladno, where he played until 1931.

He later coached Polaban Nymburk between 1941 and 1946.

National team
He represented the Czechoslovakia national team on seven occasions, scoring eight goals. His debut was on 1 July 1923, in a friendly match against Romania (a 6–0 win, with Čapek scoring twice) and his farewell match was on 28 October 1926 in a friendly match against Italy (a 3–1 win, with Čapek again scoring twice). He was member of the Czechoslovakia squad at the 1924 Olympics having played as number 10 in the first match against Turkey in a 5–2 win with him scoring the fifth goal, and in the second match against Switzerland, that ended with a 1–1 draw. Two days later a second match was played against Switzerland with Čapek being an unused substitute and ending with Czechoslovakia losing 0–1.

Honours
Slavia Prague
Czechoslovak First League: 1925

References

External links
 

1902 births
1983 deaths
Footballers from Prague
People from the Kingdom of Bohemia
Czech footballers
Czechoslovak footballers
Czech football managers
Czechoslovak football managers
Czechoslovakia international footballers
Association football forwards
SK Slavia Prague players
SK Kladno players
FK Vojvodina players
Expatriate footballers in Yugoslavia
Olympic footballers of Czechoslovakia
Footballers at the 1924 Summer Olympics
Czechoslovak expatriate sportspeople in Yugoslavia
Czechoslovak expatriate footballers